Rolf Luber is a retired East German slalom canoeist who competed in the 1960s. He won three medals at the ICF Canoe Slalom World Championships with a gold (Folding K-1 team: 1963) and two silvers (Folding K-1: 1963, K-1 team: 1965).

References

German male canoeists
Possibly living people
Year of birth missing (living people)
Medalists at the ICF Canoe Slalom World Championships